Marc Schnatterer (born 18 November 1985) is a German professional footballer who plays for Waldhof Mannheim.

Career
He's played since 2008 starting as attacking midfielder for German club 1. FC Heidenheim 1846. In the season 2010–11 he was the second best scorer of the team. In the 2011–12 season Schnatterer was the best player in the third division. His contract at FC Heidenheim was extended until 2015.

References

External links

1985 births
Living people
German footballers
Association football midfielders
Footballers from Baden-Württemberg
Karlsruher SC II players
1. FC Heidenheim players
SV Waldhof Mannheim players
2. Bundesliga players
3. Liga players
Regionalliga players